The name Maymay has been used for two tropical cyclones in the Philippines by PAGASA in the Western Pacific Ocean, succeeding Mario in its place after 2014.

 Typhoon Jebi (2018) (T1821, 25W, Maymay) – a strong Category 5 typhoon that made landfall in Japan, becoming its costliest typhoon in terms of insured losses.
 Tropical Depression Maymay (2022) – a short-lived depression that stayed off the coast of the Philippines; only acknowledged by the Japan Meteorological Agency and PAGASA.

Pacific typhoon set index articles